Lautaro Airport  was an airport serving Lautaro, a town in the Araucanía Region of Chile.

The former  grass runway has been overbuilt by high density housing. Google Earth Historical Imagery shows the housing was built sometime prior to 2 December 2010.

See also

Transport in Chile
List of airports in Chile

References

External links

Defunct airports
Airports in Chile
Airports in La Araucanía Region